Infinity-Man is a fictional character appearing in DC Comics, in the Fourth World storyline.

Publication history
Infinity-Man first appeared in Forever People #1 (February 1971).

Fictional character biography
Infinity-Man's story begins with Astorr, a powerful warrior from another planet, who rescued the badly burned Drax (brother of Darkseid) and nursed him back to health. Before dying of old age, Astorr passes on his role as the "Infinity-Man" to Drax, who then spends several years preparing for the role.

Having assumed the title of Infinity-Man, Drax goes on to serve Highfather on New Genesis, where he first encounters the Forever People and becomes a protector. Whenever Infinity-Man is needed, the Forever People grant him special powers by touching the mother boxes and reciting the word "Taaru". This ritual causes the Forever People to enter a state of limbo which lasts until Infinity-Man returns them their power. 

In one story, Darkseid believes Infinity-Man to be a threat and places him in another dimension. Infinity-Man makes a temporary home on a planet called Adon until the Forever People free him from this prison.

A later storyline focuses on Devilance the Pursuer and his vendetta against the Forever People and Infinity-Man. Devilance tracks down Infinity-Man to an island, where the two engage in a duel that results in the island's destruction. The two appear dead, but, with the Forever People's aid, Infinity-Man recovers.

In DC's year-long weekly publications, Countdown to Final Crisis, and the monthly title, Death of the New Gods, Infinity-Man is suspected by Superman, Mr. Miracle, and Orion to be the mysterious killer behind the recent deaths of the New Gods. The Mother Box, however, which summons him, appears destroyed and the Forever People murdered. Later, it is revealed that Infinity-Man, posing as Himon, is, in fact, the killer of the New Gods. Infinity-Man poses as Himon to avoid detection, to collect the dead gods' souls in a second Source Wall which surrounds the original one, and to prevent the slain gods from reuniting with the Source.

Superman challenges him, but Infinity-Man teleports away mid-battle. His motive in killing the New Gods remains unclear, but he claims to be acting on behalf of the Source itself—revealed as the "good" half of an entity that previously encompassed the Source and the Anti-Life Equation—and that his killings were intended to reunite both halves.

The "Source" or at least its physical incarnation, appears to defend his claims and leads Infinity-Man to battle Mister Miracle, now empowered with the Anti-Life Equation, near the Source Wall. Infinity-Man pushes Mister Miracle into battle, duping him into blasting away the Second Wall, and letting the Source and the Anti-Life reunite. Infinity-Man is seemingly destroyed by Mister Miracle's attack.

The New 52
The being known as Infinity-Man is an abstract of the Source itself and the moral consciousness of a once kind and idealistic monarch. This entity of a higher power didn't appear before anyone until The Forever People were on a planet-side expedition to better the underdeveloped culture of Earth as a school curriculum. They came under the onslaught of a mutated human scientist by the name of Omar Bashir who had been trapped in a TV screen within a television store by The Source agent's power.

GL/New Gods: Godhead tie-in
Back on New Genesis, scheming Himon in council with Highfather order all New Gods back to their home base at the time, which garners a surprise visit from the immaterial casting of Infinity-Man. Infinity-Man questions the elderly councilor why he was lying to his best friends and patriarch, warning him that his deceptions will have dire consequences in the future. The mysterious being quoting that his futile attempts by the former to prevent his return, Himon pleading that he had no say in the matter. Infinity Man states that they all have the gift of choice and that he chose poorly, warning him not to stand in his way as he tries to help Highfather. Back on earth, The Forever People encounter the Red Lantern Guy Gardner who, after having had his run-in with the New Gods of The Wheel, was set on the warpath for all new gods situated on earth at the time. The fuming lantern dead set on kicking them off world, but after the Forever People managed to incapacitate him they are soon attacked by Lanterns of the green corps.

Appearing out of the union of New Gods, Infinity-Man makes his presence known to Gardner first, opting to help free him of his anguish. When the Red Lantern snaps at him because of Highfather's manhunt for all lanterns by his people, the entity retorts that this war is not the source of his rage and mentions its all-consuming aspects will destroy him if not relinquished. When Guy attacks him with his red plasma, his adversary stops it mid-blast leaving him wondering if his pain lies within a deep self-hatred, not rage, which Infinity-Man recreates in the form of his reflection using his own Plasma. When the latter retorts that his rage is an integral part of him that defines his own character, the strange being complies and sends the red energy back into his face. Noting the turn of events, Green Lantern's B'ox, B'dg and Stel combine their rings to create a giant mechanized Darkseid construct to combat the Infinity Man. Though intrigued by their choice of design, the agent of the source remains undaunted all the same. He increases his own size to match their creation, recounting that nothing will prevent him from reaching New Genesis and getting back to Highfather. After Guy takes command of the construct from B'dg, the quartet enters into battle with the godly manifest; the former stating that while he is one of them, the conflict which the New Gods have started is not his own. He desperately tries to console his quarry that his fight is not with them and that he can heal the real mastermind behind all that's happening to set creation back on track.

When no quarter is given, he quotes that this battle is a waste of time and energy which he now must end. As the battle draws to a close, Infinity-Man puts Gardner to sleep using his powers; however, he comments that he was drawn by another, his name being King Faraday whose destiny Infinity Man senses shares a fate that ties with his own in some odd way, and opts instead to heal the injured party. Once the Forever People are back (after having had commerce between B'dg and Big Bear about the mysterious Infinity-Man and his varying power levels) the green lantern states that while he likes them, he may be tied to some things that even gods shouldn't tamper with. Big Bear reels back after leaving and feels bad about lying that they lose conscious memory when they become him. That every one of them shares in each other's memories and thoughts through the Mother Box used to summon him and that none of it bodes well for, or by, anyone on the team. Bear goes on to say that they also get glimpses of what Infinity-Man's own thoughts revealed to them all and if they ever want to be free of Infinity-Man, they would need to dispose of Highfather.

Identity revealed
The next day there is another epic battle between the Forever People and Aagog's Femme Fatales who were set on acquiring a certain item of interest from one of their members; where after Mark Moonrider had died and was resurrected by Dreamer utilizing the ALE. Big Bear finally managed to get his New Genesisian Quantum Computer working again only for the A.I. to reveal it had an unexpected host within its mainframe, said anomaly was none other than the Infinity Man himself who now being able to manifest without the aid of the Forever People would approach the unsuspecting Apokoliptian.

After a task delving into Highfather's past, then going by Izaya who was a much kinder, compassionate soul who cherished life dearly with the casualties of the war weighing heavily on his compassionate soul, went along the edges of the multiverse were the Promethean Giants lay encased in stone overlooking The Source Wall searching for answers along the lines of council from The Source itself. Happening along the Source Shard an original piece of the previous wall which had been decimated prior to the deaths of the Old Gods, it acted as a beacon with which to contact the veil that lies beyond it, in a heated conversation with The Source regarding his sacrificing an heir of his own with that of his deranged opposite from Apokolips. Asking Desperately how he could trade the life of the only living memory of his beloved Avia with that of the reviled spawn of his brother Darkseid, the source replied his choice was set in stone and that he would do what must be done regardless of his passions.

In a glaring flash of light Izaya was knocked out cold and in his place would wake the cold, tactile and manipulative Highfather who would go through with the morally insane peace treaty between warring worlds. While a gentle voice combed over the inert Highfather stating how he would carry the burden of their self sundering destiny, keeping their beloved wife's memory alive and pure while foreboding what will happen when the two beings reconvene. The voice was revealed to be Infinity Man, the personified moral center of Izaya that was lost to Highfather when The Source had struck him. Promising him he would return to reclaim what was his all while knowing the price he paid for their homeworld's forced peace.

Back in real space Big Bear was incredibly skeptical of believing Izaya/Infinity Man's story of him being a part of Highfather as well as Highfather being a part of him. Izaya states that he must make it back to New Genesis at all costs. When asked how he and the others played a part in all this, Infinity Man simply stated that their energies enabled him to take physical form with and without the need of a mother box to sustain him. Bear being particularly miffed by how he and his group were played like chess pieces Izaya goes onto state that helping Izaya's core self is a good greater than any they could hope to accomplish on Earth, that he needed to be a shepherd and not a warrior if the Multiverse would survive. As his host makes way to reveal the truth unveiled to him with the rest of the Forever People when Infinity Man asks if he can trust the others and is given a firm confirmation in response, he goes onto say the future for them is darker than it seems putting them all on a collision course with a deadly destiny.

Powers and abilities
Infinity-Man has seemingly limitless strength and endurance, invulnerability, flight, ability to "phase" through matter, vast energy and matter manipulation, magnetic powers, and Infinity-Beams. Other powers include a form of advanced healing and telepathy.

In the relatively few comics that Infinity Man appeared in, he displayed many abilities.  He sums up his powers during his first appearance when he says he came from a place where all natural law bends. In the first issue of the Forever People, Darkseid's "Gravity Guards" are driving Superman deep into the ground by using their power to transmit the gravity of the universe into one person. The Forever People summon Infinity Man, who quickly and effortlessly throws the Gravity Guards high into the air away from the area, saying: "the answer to gravity is anti-gravity". In the Glorious Godfrey issue, Infinity Man infiltrates Godfrey's tent by manipulating the ground's atomic structure, so he can "swim through it like the blue sea". In the same issue, he is shot at with lasers from Apokolips but stops the lasers in mid-shot and sends them back at his attackers. When he faces Mantis, Infinity Man shows his manipulation powers again by changing the atomic structure of the ice he was trapped inside. In the same issue, he survives being touched with anti-matter and finally defeats Mantis with Infinity-beams, which effectively removes the energy from Mantis. 

In one issue of Young Justice, the hero known as Impulse took part in the Forever People's summoning, resulting in the manifestation of a somewhat immature and hyperactive version of the Infinity Man, who displayed super-speed.

In other media
Infinity-Man appears in the Young Justice episode "Disordered". This version is the combined form of the Forever People via New Genesian technology and the Source.

References

External links
 Cosmic Teams: New Gods
 Index to the Earth-1 Fourth World stories

Comics characters introduced in 1971
Characters created by Jack Kirby
DC Comics superheroes
New Gods of New Genesis
New Gods of Apokolips
DC Comics deities
Fictional princes
DC Comics characters with superhuman strength
DC Comics characters with accelerated healing 
DC Comics characters who can teleport
DC Comics characters who have mental powers
DC Comics extraterrestrial superheroes
DC Comics telepaths
Fictional characters who can turn intangible
Fictional characters with electric or magnetic abilities 
Fictional characters with energy-manipulation abilities 
Fictional characters with elemental transmutation abilities 
Fictional characters with immortality
Fourth World (comics)